Parktown Convent for Girls (now Holy Family College) was a private girl's school founded in 1905. It is located in Parktown, South Africa. The school falls within Johannesburg East in Gauteng. In 1991, the school became Holy Family College.

History 

The convent was founded by Mother Ambrose Farren, [Cassie Farren DOB 1861]  who came from Moville, Co Donegal, Ireland.

Notable alumni 

Helen Suzman, a liberal South African, anti-apartheid activist and notable politician, attended the convent and matriculated from the school in 1933. Later becoming an eloquent public speaker with a sharp and witty manner, Suzman was noted for her strong public criticism of the governing National Party's policies of apartheid at a time when this was atypical of white South Africans.

Margaret Scott graduated from the convent school in 1939, went to London, and continued her training as a ballet dancer. She performed with Sadler's Wells Ballet and Ballet Rambert in England and Australia in the 1940s. She moved to Australia in 1953 and became the first director of the Australian Ballet School, a post she held for twenty-six years.

Fire 
Part of the school was destroyed by fire in 2013.

Notes

References

External links 

Schools in Gauteng
Heritage Buildings in Johannesburg